This is a list of articles about academic journals related to the field of African Studies.

A
 Abasebenzi
 ACBF Newsletter
 Acta Germanica
 Africa
 Africa & Asia: Göteborg Working Papers on Asian and African Languages and Literatures
 Africa Bibliography
 Africa Confidential
 Africa Development
 Africa Education Review
 Africa Insight
 Africa Media Review
 Africa Renewal
 Africa Report
 Africa Research Bulletin
 Africa Review of Books
 Africa: Rivista trimestrale di studi e documentazione
 Africa Spectrum
 Africa Today
 Africa Update
 Africa Week
 Africa Yearbook
 Africa-Asia Confidential
 African Affairs
 African and Asian Studies
 African and Black Diaspora
 African Anthropologist
 African Archaeological Review
 African Arts
 African Book Publishing Record
 African Communist
 African Crop Science Journal
 African Development Perspectives Yearbook
 African Development Review
 African Economic History
 African Economic History Review
 African Economic Outlook
 African Environment
 African Finance Journal
 African Health Sciences
 African Historical Review
 African Human Rights Law Journal
 African Human Rights Law Reports
 African Identities
 African Issues
 African Journal for the Psychological Study of Social Issues
 African Journal of AIDS Research
 African Journal of Aquatic Science
 African Journal of Ecology
 African Journal of International Affairs and Development
 African Journal of International and Comparative Law
 African Journal of Library, Archives and Information Science
 African Journal of Marine Science
 African Journal of Political Economy
 African Journal of Political Science
 African Journal on Conflict Resolution
 African Journals OnLine
 African Languages and Cultures
 African Markets Overview
 African Music (journal)
 African Natural History
 African Newsletter on Occupational Health and Safety
 African Population Studies
 African Renaissance
 African Safety Promotion
 African Security Review
 African Skies
 African Studies
 African Studies Abstracts Online
 African Studies Monograph
 African Studies Quarterly
 African Studies Review
 African Study Monographs
 African Symposium
 African Zoology
 Africana Libraries Newsletter
 Africanus
 Afrique & Histoire
 Afrique contemporaine
 Annales Aequatoria

B
 Bulletin of the School of Oriental and African Studies

C
 Cahiers d'Études africaines
 Callaloo
 Canadian Journal of African Studies
 Comparative and International Law Journal of Southern Africa
 Cuadernos de estudios africanos

D
 Development Southern Africa
 Die Burger

G
GIGA Focus Afrika

I
 International Journal of African Historical Studies

J
 Journal of African Archaeology
 Journal of African Business
 Journal of African Cultural Studies
 Journal of African Earth Sciences
 Journal of African Economies
 Journal of African History
 Journal of African Law
 Journal of Contemporary African Studies
 Journal of Eastern African Studies
 Journal of Legal Pluralism and Unofficial Law
 Journal of Modern African Studies
 Journal of Religion in Africa
 Journal of Social Development in Africa
 Journal of Southern African Studies
 Journal of West African Languages
 Journal on African Philosophy

K
 Koedoe
 Kroniek van Afrika

L
 Leeds African Studies Bulletin

P
 Philosophia Africana
 Politeia
 Politique africaine
 Pula

Q
 Quest

R
 Review of African Political Economy
 Rhodesiana

S
 SOAS Working Papers in Linguistics
 South African Geographical Journal
 South African Journal of Geology
 South African Historical Journal
 South African Journal of Science
 Sudan Tribune

T
 Transition Magazine

W
 Water SA
 World Development

Z
 Zaïre. Revue Congolaise-Congoleesch Tijdschrift
 Zambezia

See also
 African Journals OnLine

 
African studies